2-Diphenylphosphinobenzoic acid is an organophosphorus compound with the formula (C6H5)2PC6H4CO2H.  It is a white solid that dissolves in polar organic solvents.  The ligand is a component of catalysts used for the Shell higher olefin process.  It is prepared by the reaction of sodium diphenylphosphide with the sodium salt of 2-chlorobenzoic acid.

References

Tertiary phosphines
Benzene derivatives
Phenyl compounds